The following is an overview of the villains appearing on the live-action television series Lois & Clark: The New Adventures of Superman (1993–97).

Deathstroke
In the fourth and final season of Lois & Clark: The New Adventures of Superman, an assassin by the name of Deathstroke appeared in "Bob and Carol and Lois and Clark", played by Antonio Sabàto, Jr. The only commonality is the fact that he is an international assassin known as Deathstroke. In Lois and Clark, Deathstroke is in fact former scientist, Earl Gregg. An accident in the lab exposed him to magnetic particles, permanently altering his body and granting him magnetic powers. His assistant, who afterwards becomes his wife, helps by creating a special suit to contain his powers and keep metal from being drawn to him while out in public. The suit even has a symbol of its own: resembling the force lines of a magnetic field, forming a stylized figure eight. After this, he becomes an assassin, murdering his targets with his powers, first by drawing the target to him, then by magnetizing the iron in their blood cells, causing a figure-eight mark on the chest as the person dies of a heart attack.

The couple take the name Bob and Carol Stanford when they arrive in Metropolis; they become friends with Clark Kent and Lois Lane as they discover that Lois is going to be interviewing Grant Gendell, an eccentric reclusive billionaire. The couple plan to assassinate Gendell before he goes public, taking his identity and thus his fortune.  The plan is foiled when Superman interferes, destroying Deathstroke's containment suit, which causes him to be magnetically drawn to a steel pillar until the police arrive. Very much like Superman, Deathstroke kept a secret identity by wearing a pair of glasses.

Intergang
Intergang appeared in several episodes of Lois & Clark: The New Adventures of Superman. Some names were changed, Vincent and Morgan Edge became Bill Church, Sr., and Bill Church, Jr., Galaxy Broadcasting became Multiworld Communications, etc. No mention was made of Apokolips. The Churches were played by Peter Boyle and Bruce Campbell respectively. By the end of the series, both Churches were in prison and Intergang was being run by Bill Church, Sr.'s young wife, Mindy (Jessica Collins), who appeared to be an airhead, but was actually a ruthless mastermind. Mindy and Billy worked together to frame Bill Church, Sr. after he decides to go straight following a heart attack and transplant, but Mindy double crossed Bill, Jr. and both Bill Churches went to jail and Intergang returned under Mindy's control and the Church Group part of the organization was shut down. In a Christmas episode, Mindy keeps a low profile by working with Joey Bermuda a.k.a. The Handyman to poison Superman with a Kryptonian disease which they remove from the ship he arrived on earth in. Superman was later cured by Lois' father, Dr. Sam Lane using a controversial treatment where Superman's body was brought close enough to death to starve out the virus using Star Labs supply of Kryptonite. Mindy got her accomplice arrested when he chose his family over her, by making the authorities think that her office was his office. Mindy decides to back off against Superman and keep a low profile.

Lex Luthor
In the television series Lois & Clark: The New Adventures of Superman (1993–1997), Lex Luthor is played by actor John Shea. In the eyes of the public, he appears to be a beloved humanitarian, but Superman knows the truth. During the show's first season Clark Kent/Superman spends a good deal of time trying to prove that Luthor is corrupt, while Luthor tests Superman to find his weakness. He also comes up with dangerous plots to turn the public against Superman. At the end of season one, he manages to acquire a rare piece of kryptonite; he then devises a trap for Superman that almost kills him, but Superman narrowly escapes when Luthor leaves him to his fate. Just as Luthor is about to marry Lois Lane, the truth about his evil nature is exposed and he takes his own life rather than face imprisonment. Ironically, due to exposure to Luthor's kryptonite, Superman's powers are too weak and he cannot save him.

Following the season one finale, Lex's corpse disappears from the coroner's office. Later on, the body resurfaces in a lab where a devoted scientist, Dr. Gretchen Kelly  (played by Denise Crosby) freezes Luthor's remains and labors to bring him back from the dead. She eventually succeeds, but as a side effect of his resurrection, Lex loses his hair (thus bringing him in line with Luthor's usual look). He is quickly disenchanted with the changes that have happened during his absence, particularly the emergence of Intergang, as well as the loss of his personal fortune. Lex hides underground, again seeking kryptonite. But after kidnapping Lois in an attempt to reclaim her, he is traced to his sewer lair by Superman. This time however, Superman prevents Lex from taking his own life again to "cheat justice" and sends him to prison.

Luthor later escapes through an elaborate plot involving clones; first using a clone of the President to grant him a pardon, then kidnapping the real Lois Lane and replacing her with a clone just before her wedding to Clark. Luthor hopes to transfer the minds of himself and the genuine Lois into clone bodies so they may never be found. Although he tricks Lois' clone into divulging Superman's secret identity, he still fails in destroying Superman, and is killed in the destruction of his lab.

Unbeknownst to anyone, Luthor has illegitimate sons, two of whom try to kill Superman over the course of the last two seasons. The first one entrapped Lois and Clark in a virtual reality before the two tricked him into letting them out but during the struggle they leave him with no escape window thus trapping him in his own virtual reality and separating his mind from his body. The second one, played by Keith Brunsmann, is facially deformed and disowned by his father, reduced to living in a furnished sewer/transit station beneath Metropolis. Lex Luthor Jr. hires a handsome stand-in, Leslie Luckabee (played by Patrick Cassidy) to impersonate him; The impostor poses as Lex Jr.'s public persona as he murders the CEOs of his father's old companies and rebuilds LexCorp. While Lex Jr. and his impostor manage to get their hands on a recording of the elder Luthor (John Shea's voice) revealing Superman's secret identity, both men are later killed in an explosion that levels the crypt. Lois is initially skeptical that Lex could have fathered these adult men, but Clark insists that no one can be sure of Luthor's true age since he was "a master of deception".

Metallo
In the second-season Lois & Clark episode "Metallo", Johnny Corben (played by Scott Valentine) was the boyfriend of Lucy Lane and, unknown to her, a petty criminal. Not only does he have a criminal past, but he's hitting on Lucy for money. Lois tries to convince her sister that Johnny's no good, but Lucy will hear none of it. Johnny was shot when a holdup went wrong and having fallen into the hands of Dr. Emmett Vale, a former Lexcorp scientist and his brother Rollie Vale, rebuilt into a Kryptonite-powered cyborg named Metallo and begins causing havoc in Metropolis. And, since Metallo is powered by Kryptonite, even Superman can't stop him. When Metallo kidnaps Clark to use him as bait for luring Superman, it's up to Lois and Jimmy to save Clark, but nothing can save Metallo after a final run-in with Superman, who, now aware of his Kryptonite power source, keeps his distance, using his super breath and heat vision to defeat him. Emmett is captured, but Rollie manages to escape with Metallo's Kryptonite, leaving Metallo dead.

Mister Mxyzptlk
Howie Mandel played Mxyzptlk in the 1990s live-action series Lois & Clark: The New Adventures of Superman episode "Twas the Night Before Mxymas". Mxyzptlk is said to have a long history of earlier pre-Superman visits to Earth, being the source of stories regarding imps, genies, and leprechauns. This version of Mr. Mxyzptlk is very similar to the comics version; he is a native of the fifth dimension and the only way to get rid of him (presumably for good) was to get him to say his name backwards.

Phantom Zone villains
Although the Phantom Zone isn't explicitly mentioned or shown in Lois and Clark, there is a similar type of medium which resembles its representation in Season 4 Episode 10 "Meet John Doe" and Episode 11 "Lois and Clarks". A Utopian from the future programmed a time tablet to trap fugitive Tempus in a space-time cube if he tried to control the tablet. However, Tempus tricked Superman into being trapped in the cube which was lost in space-time. Superman was rescued by H.G. Wells when the exact second Clark had disappeared was discovered.

Prankster
The Prankster was portrayed by Bronson Pinchot in two episodes of Lois & Clark: The New Adventures of Superman. Here his name was Kyle Griffin, a man who was sent to jail five years earlier due to one of Lois Lane's articles. Griffin is assisted by a man named Victor, who is skilled at electrical engineering but lacks social graces, best explaining why the Prankster is the only man who would befriend him. In the first episode, titled "The Prankster". Griffin escapes from prison and goes after Lois posing as her secret admirer. The Prankster's comic book identity was referenced when Lois suspected the admirer was an old school acquaintance named Randall Loomis, who is ruled out as a suspect when Lois and Clark learn he's now a wealthy man about to move to Europe with his wife. He returned later in the season, along with his father and Victor, who makes a light ray capable of "freezing" people (including Superman). He attempted to use this device to kidnap the President of the United States, who was visiting Metropolis.

Toyman
A character named Winslow P. Schott appears in the Lois and Clark Christmas episode "Seasons Greedings" played by Sherman Hemsley. With a similar background to the post-Crisis Schott in the comics, he creates a toy that causes children to become greedy and adults to act like children. Unlike past versions he shows a genuine love for children and turns over a new leaf toward the end of the episode. He is referred to only once as being "a toyman" in passing onscreen. A later episode features a childlike character named Toyman (played by Grant Shaud) who abducts children. His real identity is Harold Kripstly.

References

Villains
Lists of science fiction television characters
Lists of DC Comics television characters